Ellon United Football Club are a Scottish football club from the town of Ellon, Aberdeenshire. Members of the Scottish Junior Football Association, they currently play in the North Super League. Founded around 1890, the club had also played in local Amateur and Senior competitions before joining the SJFA in 1974. They are based in The Meadows Sports Centre in Ellon along with Ellon RFC and local football sides. Club colours are red and black.

The team are managed by Keith McHattie for 2021–22 season.

Honours

 North East Division One winners: 1983–84
 ATR Group Cup: 2007–08
 Morrison Trophy: 1977–78
 McLeman Cup: 1977–78
 North Region First Division (East): 2016-17

References

External links
 Club website
 
 
 Non-league Scotland
 Scottish Football Historical Archive

 
Football in Aberdeenshire
Football clubs in Scotland
Scottish Junior Football Association clubs
Association football clubs established in 1890
Ellon, Aberdeenshire